Brenda María Izontli Alvarado Sánchez (born 16 February 1970) is a Mexican politician affiliated with the PRI. She currently serves as Deputy of the LXII Legislature of the Mexican Congress representing the Federal District.

References

1970 births
Living people
Politicians from Mexico City
Women members of the Chamber of Deputies (Mexico)
Institutional Revolutionary Party politicians
21st-century Mexican politicians
21st-century Mexican women politicians
National Autonomous University of Mexico alumni
Universidad Anáhuac México alumni
Deputies of the LXII Legislature of Mexico
Members of the Chamber of Deputies (Mexico) for Mexico City